Ehab Mohamed Mohamed Amin Saleh (born August 1, 1995) is an Egyptian professional basketball player for Al Ahly. He played college basketball for the Oregon Ducks. He spent his first three college seasons at Texas A&M–Corpus Christi, leading the NCAA Division I in steals and earning first-team All-Southland Conference accolades as a junior. Amin has played for the Egypt national basketball team at both the youth and senior levels, including the under-16 team to a gold medal at the 2011 FIBA Africa Under-16 Championship. Amin received national attention when he flopped in a Sweet Sixteen game, leading a CBS reporter to call Amin "the worst of 2019 NCAA tournament."

Early life and career
Amin was born in Alexandria, Egypt to Mohamed and Magda Amin. He has two brothers, named Hesham and Sherif. In his childhood, Amin played soccer, basketball, and swimming. Despite the popularity of soccer in his home country, he was primarily drawn to basketball, which he started at age 6, due to its faster pace. He played for Alexandria Sporting Club for 11 years, joining the senior team at age 18. He helped Sporting win the Egyptian Basketball Super League and Egypt Basketball Cup titles in the 2012–13 season. In addition, he attended Riada American School in Alexandria. 

Before the 2013–14 school year, Amin moved to the United States to attend St. John's Northwestern Military Academy, a private school in Delafield, Wisconsin but was sidelined for the entire season after breaking his back. Despite the injury, he was offered a scholarship to play college basketball for Texas A&M–Corpus Christi under head coach Willis Wilson. He eventually committed to the team and enrolled at the school on June 1, 2014.

College career
In his freshman season for Texas A&M–Corpus Christi, Amin averaged 5.2 points, 2.4 rebounds, and 1.1 steals in 15 minutes per game. On February 15, 2015, in a victory over Stephen F. Austin, he recorded a season-high 22 points, 7 rebounds, 3 assists, and 3 steals. 

As a sophomore, Amin averaged 8.6 points, 3.9 rebounds, 1.5 assists, and 1.8 steals in 18.1 minutes per game. He posted a season-best 26 points, 9 rebounds, and 3 steals in a January 19, 2016 win over Northwestern State. 

In his junior season, Amin averaged 16.9 points, 6.6 rebounds, and 2.9 assists, while leading the NCAA Division I with 3.4 steals per game. He had his best performance of the season on February 15, 2017, in an 81–70 win over McNeese State, notching career-highs of 31 points and 15 rebounds. During the game, Amin also broke the school record for steals in a single season. He also recorded a career-best 7 steals on two separate occasions as a junior. At the end of the season, after breaking the Southland Conference record for single-season steals, Amin earned Southland All-Defensive Team, first-team All-Southland, National Association of Basketball Coaches (NABC) all-region, and mid-major All-American honors.

Two weeks before the 2017–18 season, Amin suffered a hip injury that forced him to redshirt the year. On March 28, 2018, he announced his intentions to transfer from Texas A&M–Corpus Christi. After committing to Nevada in early May 2018, Amin chose to de-commit at the start of June. On June 29, he committed to Oregon. In his lone season at Oregon, Amin averaged 5.9 points and 1.5 steals per game.

Professional career
In August 2019, Amin signed with Al Ahly of the Egyptian Basketball Super League. He reportedly became the most expensive player in the history of Egyptian basketball, having an offer worth £E2.7 million.

In September 2021, Amin helped Ahly win the 2021 Arab Club Basketball Championship while being named MVP of the tournament in the process. On March 14, he won his second Egyptian Cup and was named MVP of the tournament.

On April 4, 2022, Amin extended his contract with three more seasons. On May 16, 2022, Amin recorded a team-high 35 points and 8 rebounds in Game 5 of the Egyptian Super League finals, guiding his team to a 86–73 win over Al Ittihad. As such, he helped Al Ahly win the 2021–22 Egyptian Basketball Super League title and was named the league's MVP after the game. Amin finished with three MVP awards in three different competitions in the 2021–22 season.

National team career

Junior national team
Amin played for Egypt at the 2011 FIBA Africa Under-16 Championship, leading his team to a gold medal and claiming most valuable player (MVP) honors. In his national team debut on July 8, 2011, he recorded 32 points, 3 assists, and 5 steals to coast past Mozambique, 108–54. He averaged 18.3 points, 4.3 assists, and 3.7 steals per game. He competed at the 2012 FIBA Under-17 World Championship, averaging 15.7 points, 5.1 rebounds, and 2.4 steals per game. Later in the year, Amin competed for Egypt at the 2012 FIBA Africa Under-18 Championship, guiding his team to a third-place finish while being named tournament MVP.

Senior national team
Amin debuted for the Egypt senior national team at AfroBasket 2015. He averaged 11 points, 2.7 rebounds, 2 assists, and 2.4 steals per game.

Awards and accomplishments

Club
Al Ahly
Egyptian Super League: (2022)
Egypt Cup: (2022)
Arab Club Basketball Championship: (2021)
Sporting Alexandria
Egyptian Super League: (2013)
Egypt Cup: (2013)

National team
Egypt Under-18
FIBA Africa Under-18 Championship  Gold Medal: (2012)
Egypt Under-16
FIBA Africa Under-16 Championship  Gold Medal: (2011)

Individual
Egyptian Super League MVP: (2022)
Egypt Cup MVP: (2022)
Arab Club Basketball Championship MVP: (2021)
NCAA season steals leader (2017)
First-team All-Southland: (2017)
Southland All-Defensive Team: (2017)
FIBA Africa Under-18 Championship MVP: (2012)
FIBA Africa Under-16 Championship MVP: (2011)

Career statistics

College

|-
| style="text-align:left;"| 2014–15
| style="text-align:left;"| Texas A&M–CC
| 33 || 5 || 15.0 || .427 || .192 || .690 || 2.4 || .8 || 1.1 || .2 || 5.2
|-
| style="text-align:left;"| 2015–16
| style="text-align:left;"| Texas A&M–CC
| 33 || 0 || 18.1 || .476 || .368 || .716 || 3.9 || 1.5 || 1.8 || .2 || 8.6
|-
| style="text-align:left;"| 2016–17
| style="text-align:left;"| Texas A&M–CC
| 36 || 34 || 33.7 || .462 || .289 || .716 || 6.6 || 2.9 || style="background:#cfecec;"| 3.4* || .4 || 16.9
|-
| style="text-align:left;"| 2018–19
| style="text-align:left;"| Oregon
| 37 || 6 || 17.9 || .374 || .317 || .646 || 3.1 || 1.2 || 1.5 || .1 || 5.9
|- class="sortbottom"
| style="text-align:center;" colspan="2"| Career
| 139 || 45 || 21.3 || .443 || .298 || .702 || 4.0 || 1.6 || 2.0 || .2 || 9.2

References

External links
Oregon bio
Eurobasket.com profile

1995 births
Living people
Egyptian expatriate sportspeople in the United States
Egyptian men's basketball players
Oregon Ducks men's basketball players
Point guards
Sportspeople from Alexandria
Texas A&M–Corpus Christi Islanders men's basketball players
Al Ahly basketball players
Alexandria Sporting Club players